Marisa Liz or Marisa Pinto (born 22 October 1982) is the lead singer of the Portuguese pop rock band Amor Electro. The band's repertoire combines rock music and electronic music with traditional Portuguese music.

Biography 
Marisa was born in Lisbon, Portugal.

She participated in programs such as Bravo Bravissimo and Os Principais. She began her musical career in children's bands such as Popeline and Onda Choc.

In 2002 she played the Portuguese adaptation to the music of the Disney Channel series Kim Possible.

Between 2003 and 2009, Marisa was part of Donna Maria, a band with Miguel Ângelo Majer and Ricardo Santos who left in order to begin a solo career.

She participated in the tribute show honoring Simone de Oliveira's 50-year career, Num País Chamado Simone (In a Country Called Simone), held at the Coliseu dos Recreios in Lisbon in 2008.

In 2009, Marisa left Donna Maria to continue her solo career.

In the first days of 2010 she appeared as the lead singer of a new electro-pop band, the "Catwalk", on the schedule of shows at Casino Estoril.

She thereafter introduced herself as Marisa Liz.

Marisa participated in Júlio Pereira's 2010 album Graffiti along with Sara Tavares, Dulce Pontes, Manuela Azevedo and Maria João.

In 2010, she appeared at the SIC (Sociedade Independente de Comunicação) Gala de Natal (Christmas Gala) with her group Amor Electro where they performed the single "A Máquina (Acordou)".

Marisa played the Portuguese adaptation to the music of the computer animated Italian film Winx Club 3D: Magica avventura. The film premiered on 31 March 2011. In November of that same year, the band Amor Electro reached platinum with their debut album.

Since 2014, she has been a coach on The Voice Portugal. She has won the show three times with competitors Tomás Adrião, Marvi, and Luís Trigacheiro. In 2021, she also served as a coach on The Voice Kids. 

In 2019 she formed, together with Áurea, the Elas project.

In 2020, after getting divorced, she started a passionate relationship with her co-host Áurea Isabel Ramos de Sousa. The relationship was kept private, however after making an album together rumours of their proximity emerged. In 2021, they broke up and Marisa is currently single.

References 

21st-century Portuguese women singers
1982 births
Living people